Bonneville Lock and Dam  consists of several run-of-the-river dam structures that together complete a span of the Columbia River between the U.S. states of Oregon and Washington at River Mile 146.1. The primary functions of Bonneville Lock and Dam are electrical power generation and river navigation. The dam was built and is managed by the United States Army Corps of Engineers. At the time of its construction in the 1930s it was the largest water impoundment project of its type in the nation, able to withstand flooding on an unprecedented scale. Electrical power generated at Bonneville is distributed by the Bonneville Power Administration. Bonneville Lock and Dam is named for Army Capt. Benjamin Bonneville, an early explorer credited with charting much of the Oregon Trail. The Bonneville Dam Historic District was designated a National Historic Landmark District in 1987.

History 
In 1896, prior to this damming of the river, the Cascade Locks and Canal were constructed, allowing ships to pass the Cascades Rapids, located several miles upstream of Bonneville.

Prior to the New Deal, development of the Columbia River to provide flood control, hydroelectricity, navigation, and irrigation was deemed to be important. In 1929, the US Army Corps of Engineers published the Columbia River 308 Report that recommended ten dams on the river, but no action was taken until the Franklin D. Roosevelt administration and the New Deal. During this period, America was in the Great Depression, and the dam's construction provided jobs and other economic benefits to the Pacific Northwest. Inexpensive hydroelectricity gave rise to a strong aluminum industry in the area (which has totally shut down since then). With funding from the Public Works Administration in 1934, two of the larger projects were started, the Grand Coulee Dam and the Bonneville Dam. Working in non-stop eight-hour shifts, 3,000 laborers from the relief or welfare rolls were paid 50 cents an hour for the work on the dam and raising local roads for the reservoir.

To create the Bonneville Dam and Lock, the Army Corps of Engineers first built one of the largest scale models in history of the proposed dam, the section of river on which it was to be located, and its various components to aid in the study of the construction. First a new lock and a powerhouse were constructed on the south (Oregon) side of Bradford Island, and a spillway on the north (Washington) side. Cofferdams were built to block half of the river and clear a construction site where the foundation could be reached. These projects, part of the Bonneville Dam, were completed in 1937.

Both the cascades and the old lock structure were submerged by the Bonneville Reservoir, also known as Lake Bonneville, the reservoir that formed behind the dam. The original navigation lock at Bonneville opened in 1938 and was, at that time, the highest single-lift lock in the world, with a vertical lift of 60 feet. Although the dam began to produce hydroelectricity in 1937, commercial electricity began its transfer from the dam in 1938.

A second powerhouse and dam structure were started in 1974 and completed in 1981. The second powerhouse was built by widening the river channel on the Washington side, creating Cascades Island between the new powerhouse and the original spillway. The combined rated capacity electrical output of the two power houses at Bonneville is now 1.2 gigawatts.

Despite its world record size in 1938, Bonneville Lock became the smallest of eight locks, including seven built subsequently at different locations upstream on the Columbia and Snake rivers. Eventually a new lock was needed at Bonneville; this new structure was built on the Oregon shore, opening to ship and barge traffic in 1993. The old lock is still present, but it is no longer used.

The largest fish hatchery in Oregon, called Bonneville Fish Hatchery, is located next to Bonneville Dam. It is a tourist destination that is often connected to Bonneville Dam tourism.

Dimensions and statistics 
Owner: U.S. Army Corps of Engineers, Portland District
Location: On Columbia River about 40 miles upstream from Portland, Oregon
Replaced earlier smaller lock built 1938.

It was declared a National Historic Landmark in 1987.
 both powerhouses - output capacity: 1.2 GW

Environmental and social implications 

The Bonneville Dam blocked the migration of white sturgeon to their upstream spawning areas. Sturgeon still spawn in the area below the dam, and the lower Columbia River supports a healthy sturgeon population. Small, very depressed populations of white sturgeon persist in the various reservoirs upstream.

To cope with fish migration problems, the dam features fish ladders to help native salmon and steelhead get past the dam on their journey upstream to spawn. The large concentrations of fish swimming upstream serve as a tourist attraction during the spawning season. California sea lions are also attracted to the large number of fish, and are often seen around the base of the dam during the spawning season. By 2006, the growing number of sea lions and their impact on the salmon population had become worrisome to the Army Corps of Engineers and environmentalists. Historically, pinnipeds such as sea lions and seals have hunted salmon in the Columbia River as far as The Dalles and Celilo Falls,  farther upstream from Bonneville, as remarked upon by people such as George Simpson in 1841.

Electricity controversy 

Creating electricity was a sensitive issue at the time of the Bonneville Dam's construction, which was funded with federal dollars. The Franklin D. Roosevelt administration wanted the electricity produced to be a public source of power and prevent energy monopolies. Advocates for private sale of the electricity were opposed to this, and they did not want the government to interfere. In 1937, the Bonneville Project Act was signed by Roosevelt, giving the dam's power over to the public and creating the Bonneville Power Administration (BPA). A rate of $17.50 per kilowatt-year (about 0.2 cents/kWh) was maintained by the BPA for the next 28 years.

Power production is the primary function of the Bonneville Dam. The two Bonneville powerhouses generate about 5 billion kWh of electricity each year. The Bonneville Dam supplies nearly 500,000 homes with electricity, assuming each household consumes 10,000 kWh of electricity per year. In 1998, its generation costs were about 1.2 cents/kWh, which was much higher than historic costs mainly because the Bonneville Power Administration (BPA) was still paying off the second powerhouse which was built in 1982. Consumers were charged 2.3 cents/kWh to account for transmission and other costs.

Gallery

See also 

 Cascade Locks and Canal, which preceded the construction of the dam
 Grand Coulee Dam, a much larger dam far upstream on the Columbia River
 Charles McNary, a U.S. Senator from Oregon who was instrumental in passing legislation to build the dam
 List of dams in the Columbia River watershed

References 

Bonneville Lock and Dam. A National Historic Landmark Serving the Northwest. 2001. U.S. Government Printing Office, 2001-691-677. U.S. Army Corps of Engineers, Portland District, public information pamphlet distributed at the Bonneville Lock and Dam visitor centers.
"Bonneville Lock and Dam: A Gift from the People of the Great Depression." Barry, Joseph Patrick, published by Retired Ranger and Associates, 296 pages, October, 2017

External links

U.S. Army Corps of Engineers – Bonneville Lock and Dam
Bonneville Power Administration

Dams on the Columbia River
Columbia River Gorge
Dams in Oregon
Dams in Washington (state)
Gravity dams
Hydroelectric power plants in Oregon
Hydroelectric power plants in Washington (state)
Historic Columbia River Highway
Run-of-the-river power stations
United States Army Corps of Engineers dams
Buildings and structures in Multnomah County, Oregon
Buildings and structures in Skamania County, Washington
Dams completed in 1937
Energy infrastructure completed in 1937
Dams on the National Register of Historic Places in Oregon
Dams on the National Register of Historic Places in Washington (state)
National Register of Historic Places in Multnomah County, Oregon
National Register of Historic Places in Skamania County, Washington
National Historic Landmarks in Oregon
National Historic Landmarks in Washington (state)
Historic Civil Engineering Landmarks
Industry museums in Oregon
Museums in Multnomah County, Oregon
New Deal in Oregon
New Deal in Washington (state)
1937 establishments in Oregon
1937 establishments in Washington (state)
Historic American Engineering Record in Oregon
Historic American Engineering Record in Washington (state)
Locks of Oregon
Locks of Washington (state)
Public Works Administration in Oregon
Dams with fish ladders